Joe, Joey or Joseph Newman may refer to:

Musicians
Joe Newman (trumpeter) (1922–1992), American jazz musician
Joey Newman (born 1976), American film composer, orchestrator, arranger and conductor
Joe Newman (born 1991), English lead singer with indie rock band Alt-J

Writers
Joseph Simon Newman (1891–1960), American poet and entrepreneur
Joseph Newman (journalist) (1913–1995), American who lived in and wrote about Japan

Others
Joseph Newman (Texas settler) (1787–1831), Texas settler, one of Austin's Old Three Hundred
Joseph Newman (politician) (1815–1892), New Zealand MP
Joseph M. Newman (1909–2006), American film and TV director
Joseph Westley Newman (1936–2015), American inventor who claimed to have built an energy machine
Joe Newman (born 1937), American businessman, co-founder and CEO of American Basketball Association (2000–present)